Don Joaquín Roncali y Ceruti, 1st Marquis of Roncali, Grandee of Spain (8 September 1811 in Cádiz, Spain – 6 February 1875 in Madrid, Spain) was a Spanish noble and politician who served as Minister of State in 1868. Roncaly ceased in his post because of the Spanish Glorious Revolution, which deposed Queen Isabella II of Spain.

Roncali was the eldest son of Agustín de Roncali y Martínez de Murcia, Knight of Santiago, and his wife María del Carmen Ceruti y Feit. His younger brother was the prominent politician Federico de Roncali, 1st Count of Alcoy. Among other honours, Roncali was appointed Knight Collar of the Order of Charles III, Knight Grand Cross of the Orders of Isabella the Catholic, Pius IX, Christ of Portugal, the Crown of Prussia and Saint Januarius. On 14 May 1867, Roncali was granted the Marquisate of Roncali by the Queen, and on 6 August 1868, his title received the Grandeeship of Spain.

He married in 1850 María Dolores de Gaviria y Gutiérrez, daughter of the Count and the Countess of Casa Gaviria, and had a single daughter Doña María Cristina de Roncali, 2nd Marquise of Roncali (1851–1928, pictured right).

References 
Villareal de Álava, Marquis of, The Roncallis in Spain, Revista Hidlaguía, Madrid, 1958, p. 1012.  
Personal dossier of the Marquis of Roncali. Spanish Senate

|-
 

Marquesses of Spain
Foreign ministers of Spain
Grand Crosses of the Order of Christ (Portugal)
Knights of the Order of Pope Pius IX
Knights Grand Cross of the Order of Isabella the Catholic
1811 births
1875 deaths
Moderate Party (Spain) politicians
19th-century Spanish politicians
Justice ministers of Spain
Grandees of Spain